Tan Sri Datuk Seri Panglima Haji Annuar bin Musa (Jawi: أنور بن موسى; born 18 May 1956) is a Malaysian politician who served as the Minister of Communications and Multimedia in the Barisan Nasional (BN) administration under former Prime Minister Ismail Sabri Yaakob from August 2021 to the collapse of the BN administraiton in November 2022, Minister of Federal Territories under former Prime Minister Muhyiddin Yassin in the Perikatan Nasional (PN) administration from March 2020 to the collapse of the PN administration in August 2021, Minister of Rural Development and Minister of Youth and Sports under former Prime Minister Mahathir Mohamad in the Barisan Nasional (BN) administration from October 1990 to December 1999 and the Member of Parliament (MP) for Ketereh from May 2013 to November 2022 and for Peringat from April 1995 to November 1999. He is an independent and was member, Member of the Supreme Council, Information Chief, Division Chairman of Ketereh of the United Malays National Organisation (UMNO), a component party of the BN coalition. He also served as the Secretary-General of BN from March 2020 to January 2021. He was removed from UMNO in December 2022.

He was the president of Kelantan FA (Kafa) from 2009 until his resignation on 8 November 2016 but stay as its adviser.

In 2018, he was nominated for the new FAM presidency role by Kuala Lumpur FA, reported in a Fox Sports Asia article. But he withdraw from the presidency race again.

Early life and education
Annuar was born in Bukit Marak, Bachok, Kelantan, Federation of Malaya. He is an alumnus of Royal Military College (RMC), Sungai Besi. Annuar has a master's degree in Construction Management from the University College London. Prior to that, he earned a bachelor's in Town and Country Planning from Universiti Teknologi Malaysia (UTM).

Political career
Annuar is a member of the Malaysian Institute of Planners. He served as assistant director of Town Planning, City Hall and director, Corporate Planning Division, the State Economic Development Corporation. Although he has been politically active in Kelantan UMNO since 1979, but only significantly when he was selected first contested the Kelantan State Legislative Assembly (DUN) Peringat constituency in 1986 general election and defeated the candidate from the Pan-Malaysian Islamic Party (PAS), Daud bin Jusoh with a majority of 136 votes.

In 1990 he lost to the opposition candidate, Mohamad Sabu from PAS in Parliament stage. He won the 1995 general election in the same Parliament seat, and defeated candidate from Parti Melayu Semangat 46 (S46), Rafei Mat Salleh. Annuar again lost in the parliamentary phase of the 1999 general election, this time to Parti Keadilan Rakyat (PKR) candidate, Mohamed Mustafa.

He switched to contest the state seat again in 2004 general election and won the Kok Lanas state seat by beating Md. Ashari Mamat from PAS. He returns to contest the Ketereh federal constituency in 2008 general election but lost to PKR candidate, Abdul Aziz Kadir. However he contested the same constituency in 2013 general election and managed to win it back from the same PKR candidate. Annuar managed to retain the Ketereh seat again in 2018 general election.

In addition of contesting general elections experience, Annuar also has extensive experience in the party, including a member of the MT from 1991 to present. He also served as Chairman of the Kelantan Barisan Nasional (1994–2001) and Deputy Chairman of the State Umno Liaison Body (1991–2003). On the part he was the chief of the new Ketereh previously known as Nilam Puri and phase from 1986 to present.

Controversies and issues
In 2016, Annuar's decision to quit as Kafa president during Kelantan football team, The Red Warriors (TRW) was going through bad performances and the financial problem of settling outstanding footballers and even coach salaries was questioned by many who had likened him to "the captain abandoning his sinking ship".

Annuar embroiled himself in a rocky conflict and contentious relationship with the Crown Prince of Johor Tunku Ismail Sultan Ibrahim, another potential FAM presidency candidate; in the run-up to the FAM election in 2017. Tunku Ismail has alleged that a certain "Tan Sri", apparently was referring to Annuar, who is Majlis Amanah Rakyat (MARA) chairman had forced its entities to sponsor Kafa. In a Facebook post on 12 January 2017, Tunku Ismail has revealed photographs of documents showing sponsorship to Kafa; a RM500,000 by Universiti Kuala Lumpur (UniKL) and an additional RM200,000 by Mara Investment Berhad (PMB); both subsidiaries of MARA. On 31 January 2017, MARA announced Annuar has been suspended and asked to go on leave as MARA chairman and PMB head pending an internal investigation and audit is conducted into allegations made against him. Suspended Annuar also was quizzed by the Malaysian Anti-Corruption Commission (MACC) for four hours on 3 February 2017.

Annuar pulled out from the 2017 FAM presidency election lastly citing the reason to focus on his political obligation. He also did not renew his MARA chairman contract ended on 11 August 2017 amid still under suspension. Eventually MACC too decided not to press charges against him due to the allegations insufficient evidence.

Repeated violations of SOP
On 28 January 2021, Annuar uploaded a photo on the social media platform. The photo shows him walking in the community with the former head of Kuala Lumpur City Council Nordin Razak and Nik Aminaldin Nik Jaafar. The three people in the photo did not Keeping personal distance and not wearing a mask has aroused dissatisfaction among opposition members and netizens. On 29 January, Annuar told Malaysiakini that he and the other two elders were coincidentally meet themselves, and all three of them came out for a walk from their homes.

After attending the event on 13 February, Annuar had a meal with several officials, which once again aroused dissatisfaction among netizens, accusing him of violating SOP. Annuar uploaded a photo of the event on Facebook and wrote: "I was at the farm just now, I sat for a while and then moved away because the organizer did not follow the SOP.". Later, the organizer apologized for not complying with the SOP. On 16 February, Kuala Lumpur Police Chief Saiful Azly Kamaruddin said to "Perspective Malaysia": "The Cheras police have received reports from the public and have opened investigations and will take a statement from him (Annuar) this week." On 17 February, Annuar revealed on Twitter that he had taken a confession to the police station on 16 February and explained to the police that he was accused of violating the movement restriction order at the dinner party. 

On 10 July of the same year, Annuar pointed out in a social media tweet that he and his wife went to visit former Prime Minister Abdullah Badawi and his wife, and had lunch and stayed for 2 hours at Abdullah’s home. Netizens accused him of violating the law and SOP for epidemic prevention. On 12 July, the director of the Dang Wangi OCPD Asst Comm Mohamad Zainal Abdullah confirmed that the police had invoked an existing law to formally issue a fine of 2,000 ringgits to Annuar.

Election results

Honours

Honours of Malaysia
  :
  Commander of the Order of Loyalty to the Crown of Malaysia (PSM) – Tan Sri (2008)

  :
  Grand Commander of the Order of Malacca (DGSM) – Datuk Seri (2005)
  :
  Grand Knight of the Order of the Crown of Pahang (SIMP) – formerly Dato', now Dato' Indera (1992)
  :
  Grand Commander of the Order of Kinabalu (SPDK) – Datuk Seri Panglima (2006)

External links

References

Living people
1956 births
People from Kelantan
Malaysian people of Malay descent
Malaysian Muslims
Malaysian businesspeople
Former United Malays National Organisation politicians
Malaysian United Indigenous Party politicians
Government ministers of Malaysia
University of Technology Malaysia alumni
Members of the Dewan Rakyat
Members of the Dewan Negara
Members of the Kelantan State Legislative Assembly
Kelantan FA
Grand Commanders of the Order of Kinabalu
Commanders of the Order of Loyalty to the Crown of Malaysia
21st-century Malaysian politicians